The 2012 Fordham Rams football team represented Fordham University in the 2012 NCAA Division I FCS football season. They were led by first year head coach Joe Moorhead and played their home games at Coffey Field. They are a member of the Patriot League.

Fordham was not eligible for the Patriot League championship because they used scholarship players while the rest of the league's members do not.

They finished the season 6–5, 3–3 in Patriot League play. However, their conference record will be officially recognized as 0–0.

Schedule

References

Fordham
Fordham Rams football seasons
Fordham Rams football